Jonathan James Northam Dewes (born 19 August 1995) is an English first-class cricketer.

The son of the first-class cricketer Jim Dewes, and the grandson of the Test cricketer John Dewes, he was born at Frimley in August 1995. Dewes played minor counties cricket for Dorset in 2013, making one appearance in the Minor Counties Championship against Wales Minor Counties at Bournemouth. He later studied at Durham University, where he played two first-class matches for Durham MCCU in 2016, against Gloucestershire at Bristol, and Durham at Chester-le-Street.

References

External links

1995 births
Living people
Cricketers from Frimley
People educated at Wellington College, Berkshire
Alumni of Durham University
English cricketers
Dorset cricketers
Durham MCCU cricketers